The Deathlord of Ixia was the seventeenth book of the Lone Wolf book series, written by Joe Dever and now illustrated by Brian Williams.

Gameplay

Lone Wolf books rely on a combination of thought and luck. Certain statistics such as combat skill and endurance attributes are determined randomly before play. The player is then allowed to choose Grandmaster Kai disciplines and a selection of Dessi and Crystal Star magics. This number depends directly on how many books in the series have been completed ("Grandmaster rank"). With each additional book completed, the player chooses one additional discipline. The Grandmaster series is different from any in the previous series of books because it gives Lone Wolf spells to use which grow more numerous as his Grandmaster Rank increases.

Plot

Reception
This game is notable for the very elaborate plot and the extremely difficult combat skill of the Deathlord, making him one of the hardest of all opponents in the entire gameseries.

External links
Gamebooks - Lone Wolf
Gamebooks - The Deathlord of Ixia
Project Aon - Online editions of Lone Wolf books
Book Review

1992 fiction books
Lone Wolf (gamebooks)
Berkley Books books